Events in the year 2011 in Kerala

Incumbents 
Governors of Kerala - R. S. Gavai (till September), M. O. H. Farook (from September)

Chief Minister of Kerala - V. S. Achuthanandan (till May 14), Oommen Chandy (from May 18)

Events 

 January 14 - 2011 Sabarimala crowd crush kills 106.
 February 1 - Soumya murder case
 February 11 - International Container Transshipment Terminal, Kochi inaugurated by Shri  Manmohan Singh, the Prime Minister of India.
 February 18 - R. Balakrishna Pillai remanded to Central Prison, Poojappura following Supreme Court of India finding him and two others guilty over Idamalayar corruption case that caused loss to Kerala State Electricity Board.
 April 13 - 2011 Kerala Legislative Assembly election held.

Deaths 

October 30 - T. M. Jacob , 61, politician

See also 

 History of Kerala
 2011 in India

References 

2010s in Kerala